Albert Szatola (16 February 1927 – 19 April 2010) was a Hungarian equestrian. He competed in two events at the 1956 Summer Olympics.

References

1927 births
2010 deaths
Hungarian male equestrians
Olympic equestrians of Hungary
Equestrians at the 1956 Summer Olympics
Sportspeople from Budapest